William Hamilton Bell (August 8, 1863 1937) was an English American immigrant, machinist, and Republican politician from Racine, Wisconsin.  He was a member of the Wisconsin State Assembly during the 1905, 1907, and 1911 sessions, and served several years on the Racine city council.

Biography
Bell was born on August 8, 1863, in Liverpool, England. He moved to Racine, Wisconsin, in 1880.

Career
Bell was a member of the Assembly during the 1905, 1907 and 1911 sessions. Other positions he held include Racine alderman. He was a Republican.

References

Politicians from Liverpool
19th-century English politicians
19th-century American politicians
20th-century American politicians
English emigrants to the United States
Politicians from Racine, Wisconsin
Republican Party members of the Wisconsin State Assembly
Wisconsin city council members
1863 births
20th-century deaths
Year of death missing